Carabus linnei is a species of ground beetle in the family Carabidae. It is found in Europe.

Subspecies
These four subspecies belong to the species Carabus linnei:
 Carabus linnei folgariacus Bernau, 1913  (Austria and Italy)
 Carabus linnei hoverlaensis A.Müller & Panin, 2018  (Ukraine)
 Carabus linnei linnei Panzer, 1810  (Europe)
 Carabus linnei macaieri Dejean, 1826  (Romania)

References

linnei
Beetles of Europe
Beetles described in 1832